190 (one hundred [and] ninety) is the natural number following 189 and preceding 191.

In mathematics
190 is a triangular number, a hexagonal number, and a centered nonagonal number, the fourth figurate number (after 1, 28, and 91) with that combination of properties. It is also a truncated square pyramid number.

Integers from 191 to 199
191 
191 is a prime number.
192
192 = 26 × 3 is a 3-smooth number, the smallest number with 14 divisors.
193
193 is a prime number.
194
194 = 2 × 97 is a Markov number, the smallest number written as the sum of three squares in five ways, and the number of irreducible representations of the Monster group.
195
195 = 3 × 5 × 13 is the smallest number expressed as a sum of distinct squares in 16 different ways.
196
196 = 22 × 72 is a square number.
197
197 is a prime number and a Schröder–Hipparchus number.
198
198 = 2 × 32 × 11 is the smallest number written as the sum of four squares in ten ways.
No integer factorial ever ends in exactly 198 zeroes in base 10 or in base 12.
There are 198 ridges on a U.S. dollar coin.
It is currently the lowest natural number without its own Wikipedia page, making it a candidate for the lowest uninteresting number.
199
199 is a prime number and a centered triangular number.

See also

 190 (disambiguation)

References 

Integers